Eugenia is a feminine first name related to the masculine name Eugene that comes from the Greek eugenes 'well-born', from eu- 'well' + genes 'born' (from genos).

Variants include Eugénia (Portuguese), Eugénie (French), Eugènia (Catalan), Uxía (Galician), Evgenia, Eugenija (Lithuanian) and Yevgenia or Yevgeniya (also transliterated as Evgenia or Evgeniya) as well as Yevheniia in Ukraine.

People 
Notable people with the name include:
 Saint Eugenia of Rome (died 258)
 Blessed Eugenia Smet (1825–1871), French nun, founder of the Society of the Helpers of the Holy Souls
 Princess Eugenia Maximilianovna of Leuchtenberg
 Eugenia Abu, Nigerian journalist
 Eugenia Bonetti, Italian nun
 Eugenia Bujak, Lithuanian-Polish cyclist
 Eugenia Calle (1952–2009), American cancer epidemiologist
 Eugênia Câmara (1837–1879), Portuguese actress
Eugenia Campbell Nowlin (1908–2003), American arts administrator, artist
Eugenia Caruso, Italian actress and screenwriter
Eugenia Cauduro (born 1968), Mexican actress
 Eugenia Charles (1919–2005), Prime Minister of Dominica
 Eugenia Cheng, (born Hong Konger-British mathematician and pianist
 Eugenia Chuprina (b. 1971) Ukrainian poet, writer, playwright
 Eugenia Clinchard (1909-1989), American child actress
Eugenia Cooney (born 1994), American Internet personality
 Eugenia Errázuriz (1860–1951), Chilean patroness of the arts
 Eugenia Falleni (1875-1939), Italian-Australian transgender man convicted of murder
 Eugenia Gabrieluk (born 1967), Russian pianist
 Eugenia Kim, Korean-American hat designer 
 Eugenia Kisimova (1831–1885), Bulgarian women's rights activist
 Eugenia Kuzmina (born 1987), Russian-American model and actress
 Eugenia Mandzhieva (born 1985), Russian fashion model and actress of Kalmyk descent
 Eugenia Manolidou (born 1975), Greek composer and conductor
 Eugenia Malinnikova (born 1974), Russian mathematician
 Eugenia L. Mobley (1922–2011), American dentist, college dean
 Eugenia de Montijo (1826–1920), wife of Napoleon III of France
 Eugenia Paul (1935-2010) American actress and dancer
 Eugenia del Pino (born 1945) Ecuadorian developmental biologist
 Eugenia Popa (born 1973), Romanian gymnast
 Eugenia Popescu-Județ (1925–2011), Romanian dancer
 Eugenia Price (1916–1996), American authoress
 Eugenia Rasponi (1873-1958), Italian noblewoman, suffragist, and businesswoman
 Eugenia Ravasio (1907-1990), Italian Catholic nun and mystic
 Eugenia Shi-Chia Chang, South African Member of Parliament
 Eugenia Silva (born 1976) Spanish model 
 Eugenia Smith (1899–1997), claimed to be Grand Duchess Anastasia Nikolaevna of Russia
 Eugenia Tsoumani-Spentza (died 2020), Greek politician
 Eugenia Tymoshenko (born 1980), Ukrainian entrepreneur and activist
 Eugenia Volodina (born 1984), Russian supermodel
 Eugenia Washington (1938-1900), Catholic historian, civil servant, and one of the founders of Daughters of the American Revolution and Daughters of the Founders and Patriots of America
 Eugenia Yuan (born 1976), American gymnast and actress 
 Eugenia Zukerman (born 1944), American flutist

Fictional characters 

 Eugenia "Skeeter" Phelan, a protagonist in The Help
 Eugenia Randolph Lord, a character in One Life to Live
 Eugenia Dermody, a character in season 1 of Ozark
 Eugenia, a minor character in season 1 and 2 of Snowpiercer

References

Given names of Greek language origin
Italian feminine given names
Romanian feminine given names
Greek feminine given names
Spanish feminine given names